The Whippingham Papers is a Victorian work of sado-masochistic pornography by St George Stock (a probable pseudonym, also credited with The Romance of Chastisement) and published by Edward Avery in December 1887.  It consists of a collection of pieces on flagellation, some of which were contributed anonymously by Algernon Charles Swinburne, including his 94-stanza poem "Reginald's Flogging".

References
 Louis J. Bragman (1934). "The Case of Algernon Charles Swinburne: a Study in Sadism". Psychoanal. Rev., 21:59–74.
 Martha Cornog, Timothy Perper, "For sex education, see librarian: a guide to issues and resources", Greenwood Publishing Group, 1996, pp. 199–200
 Richard Fantina, "Straight writ queer: non-normative expressions of heterosexuality in literature", McFarland, 2006, p.255
 Jon R. Godsall, "The Tangled Web: A Life of Sir Richard Burton", Troubador Publishing Ltd, 2008, p.533
 Patrick J. Kearney, "A history of erotic literature", Macmillan, 1982, p.117
 Peter Mendes, "Clandestine erotic fiction in English, 1800–1930: a bibliographical study", Scolar Press, 1993, pp. 12–13
 Eve Kosofsky Sedgwick, "Novel gazing: queer readings in fiction", Series Q, Duke University Press, 1997, p.269
 Joanne Shattock, "The Cambridge Bibliography of English Literature:, Volume 4; Volumes 1800–1900", Cambridge University Press, 2000, p.1905
 Donald Serrell Thomas, "Swinburne, the poet in his world", Oxford University Press, 1979, pp.109,215–216
 T. Earle Welby, "A Study of Swinburne", Kessinger Publishing, 2005, p.235

1887 books
British pornography
BDSM literature
Books about flagellation